Korzhin Island (also known as Kurzhin, Kurdzhyn, Korzhun, Kurzhon or Kurdzhun Island) is a long and flat island in Lake Balkhash. It is located in the central portion of the lake.

Geography

Administratively Korzhin Island belongs to the Almaty Province of Kazakhstan.

References

Lake Balkhash
Lake islands of Kazakhstan